Macquarie Towns or the Five Macquarie Towns is the collective term for the towns of Castlereagh, Pitt Town, Richmond, Wilberforce and Windsor, all located on and around the Hawkesbury River in New South Wales, Australia.

All five towns were established in December 1810 by Governor of New South Wales Lachlan Macquarie. Macquarie established the towns on higher ground following serious flooding of the Hawkesbury River the previous year. This was important as the area provided the fledgling colony of New South Wales with half its annual grain requirements.

References

External links
Extract from Macquarie's diary detailing his establishment and naming of the five towns.

History of New South Wales
Hawkesbury River
City of Hawkesbury